The GMD GMD1 is a diesel locomotive originally produced by General Motors Diesel (GMD), the Canadian subsidiary of General Motors Electro-Motive Division, between August 1958 and April 1960. This road switcher locomotive is powered by a 12-cylinder EMD 567C diesel engine, capable of producing . The GMD1 was built on either Flexicoil A1A-A1A (for light-rail prairie branchlines) or Flexicoil B-B trucks. One hundred and one were built, Canadian National (CN) purchased 96 and Northern Alberta Railways (NAR) the remaining five, which later became part of CN's fleet when they acquired majority interest in NAR.

As the light branches were abandoned or rehabilitated, the bulk were upgraded with new fuel tanks and Flexicoil B-B trucks and assigned to yard and transfer service. In 1988/89, 39 GMD1s were remanufactured by CN as GMD 1Us, 12 emerged with B-B trucks and continued to run long-hood-forward, while the others retained their A1A trucks and were converted to shorthood-forward operation. As of late 2018, 11 remained in service with CN.  CN retired its last GMD1 units in April 2021.

Original owners

Second-hand users

A number of GMD1 units were sold off in the 1990s and 2000s to rebuilders, leasers, regional and shortline railways. Twenty were acquired by Ferrocarriles de Cuba. Oregon Pacific Railroad acquired CN No. 1413, and is now numbered OPR No. 1413. Cando Rail Services acquired CN 1401, 1434 and 1435 in late 2018. CN 1401 is now CCGX 1009, CN 1435 is CCGX 1010.  Waterloo Central Railway took donation of and restored a GMD1 in 2021.

References 

http://rapidotrains.com/gmd-1-master-class/

External links

See also
List of GMD Locomotives

GMD-1
B-B locomotives
A1A-A1A locomotives
Railway locomotives introduced in 1958
Standard gauge locomotives of Canada
Diesel-electric locomotives of Canada